The Indonesian Wikipedia (WBI for short) is the edition of Wikipedia in the Indonesian language. The Indonesian Wikipedia is the fifth-fastest-growing Wikipedia in an Asian language after the Japanese, Chinese, Korean, and Turkish language Wikipedias. It ranks 25th in terms of depth among Wikipedias. Its first article was written on 30 May 2003, yet its Main Page was created six months later on 29 November 2003.

There are  articles in the Indonesian Wikipedia. In April 2016, there were 462 editors who made at least five edits in that month.

Background

Although the Indonesian language is similar to the Malay language, the Indonesian Wikipedia remains separate from the Malay Wikipedia (initiated in October 2002). The Indonesian and Malay Wikipedias were started separately by two different user groups within six months of each other. In 2009, Andrew Lih wrote "Because these groups are drawn on national boundaries, merging is not likely to happen soon."

Indonesian is a normative form of the Malay language, an Austronesian (or Malayo-Polynesian) language which had been used as a lingua franca in the Indonesian archipelago for centuries, and was elevated to the status of an official language with the Indonesian Declaration of Independence in 1945, drawing inspiration from the Sumpah Pemuda (Youth Pledge) event in 1928. It is very similar to the official Malaysian form of the language. However, it does differ from the Malaysian form in some ways, with key differences in pronunciation and vocabulary, due in large part to the many Dutch words in the Indonesian vocabulary. It is spoken as a mother tongue by only 7% of the population of Indonesia, but altogether more than 200 million people speak it. The Malay language is spoken by ethnic groups who reside in the Malay Peninsula, southern Thailand, parts of the Philippines, and Singapore. Malay is also considered one of the dialects of the Indonesian language by Indonesians living in central eastern Sumatra, the Riau Islands and parts of the coast of Borneo.

Contributors
In 2004, Tempo magazine published a feature about the Indonesian Wikipedia, in which Revo Soekatno, one of its best known contributors, described it as the "Encyclopedia from the boarding houses", meaning an encyclopedia that was produced by Indonesians living and studying overseas. The article contributed to the popularization of Wikipedia in the archipelago and since then, the Indonesian Wikipedia has seen its number of users rise remarkably.

In 2006, following Time featuring "You" as its person of the year, Kompas published a feature article on Revo where he was called the "Father of Wikipedia in Indonesian". The article highlighted the spirit of participation as the type of "addiction to the cyberspace that needed to be endorsed". Other Indonesian publications followed suit to refer to Revo Soekatno as an "activist that built a community portal in Indonesia" praising his contributions to the presence of Indonesia in the Internet.

In February 2009, the Indonesian Wikipedia achieved the milestone of 100,000 articles. One of the contributors mentioned in the article was the user borgx, who made 80,000 edits starting in 2005. That year, the Indonesian Wikipedia had only fifty active contributors.

Workshop and seminars
In March 2007, Bina Nusantara University invited Indonesian Wikipedians to speak at the first Wikipedia seminar for the public and to introduce Wikipedia Bahasa Indonesia and Wikimedia Foundation projects at its campus in Jakarta.

In November 2007, the Indonesian government, through its Department of Communication and Information, decided to establish an annual Indonesian ICT Award and invited the Indonesian Wikipedia community to hold a workshop on how to write Wikipedia articles. Ivan Lanin, one of the speakers interviewed by Antara, stated that the number of contributors to the Indonesian Wikipedia was rising, and the articles were beginning to become more diverse. According to Revo's speech, the challenge for the Indonesian Wikipedia in the future was to gain credibility and give the public assurance about the quality of the content provided.

The first day of the workshop was attended by 40 people, although the number of computers provided for hands-on practice was considerably less than the number of participants.

The following year, at the 2008 Indonesian ICT Awards, the Indonesian Wikipedia community held separate workshop sessions for the public and for organizations.

Partnership with Google 
On 4 December 2018, Google announced a partnership with Wikipedia in order to translate relevant Wikipedia's articles from English to Bahasa Indonesia language through the AI-powered Google Neural Machine Translation.

Indonesian Wikipedia DVD

In August 2008, the Indonesian version of CHIP magazine distributed a complimentary DVD containing more than 80,000 articles (without images) with its 11th anniversary edition. This edition also featured a three-page Wikipedia article titled "Wikipedia: When one thousand brains are better than one". The article provided an extensive history of Wikipedia, including the Indonesian Wikipedia, as well as a description of the Wikimedia Indonesia chapter, which was in preparation at that time.

However, a DVD version of the Indonesian Wikipedia with photos was already in existence since April 2008 and could be purchased online from an independent vendor for 20 thousand rupiah, around US$2.

Controversies

Mass killings and communist party 
Zulkarnain pressured the chief of the Indonesian National Police Idham Azis and President Joko Widodo to take action and arrest the author. Suharto and PKI's photo was later removed from the article.

The Crescent Star Party's leader urged Wikipedia to remove that edit forever, also claiming that PKI is the writer. An expert on communism called the article "brainwashing." The Indonesian Democratic Party of Struggle states that it is a "reflection of the country's war on history."

The Wikimedia Foundation of Indonesia states that they are "neutral and unpaid for any articles made in its site." It also acknowledged that many of the texts were mainly translated from English Wikipedia.

Milestones 
 1,000 articles: 16 March 2004
 10,000 articles: 31 May 2005
 50,000 articles: 1 February 2007
 100,000 articles: 21 February 2009
 180,000 articles: 26 December 2011
 200,000 articles: 27 March 2012
 300,000 articles: Oct 2013
 400,000 articles: 27 April 2017
 500,000 articles: 15 August 2019
 600,000 articles: 18 October 2021

Related Wikipedias 
These are Wikipedias written in local Indonesian languages.
 Acehnese Wikipedia (:ace:)
 Balinese Wikipedia (:ban:)
 Banjarese Wikipedia (:bjn:)
 Banyumasan Wikipedia (:map-bms:)
 Buginese Wikipedia (:bug:)
 Javanese Wikipedia (:jv:)
 Madurese Wikipedia (:mad:)
 Malay Wikipedia (:ms:)
 Minangkabau Wikipedia (:min:)
 Nias Wikipedia (:nia:)
 Sundanese Wikipedia (:su:)
 Gorontalo Wikipedia (:gor:)

See also 
 Indonesian Wikipedia: Announcements - extensive, more complete table of data on the growing number of articles in Indonesian Wikipedia. 
 Indonesian Wikipedia: Statistics - various statistics reflecting the growth of Indonesian Wikipedia. 
 Proposed merger of Indonesian Wikipedia and Malay Wikipedia 
 :ms:Wikipedia:Proposal to unify - usulan penggabungan di Wikipedia bahasa Melayu. 
 Revo Arka Giri Soekatno, the first contributor to Indonesian Wikipedia

References
 Lih, Andrew. The Wikipedia Revolution: How a Bunch of Nobodies Created the World's Greatest Encyclopedia. Hyperion, New York City. 2009. First Edition.  (alkaline paper).

Notes

External links
 
 Putra, Budi (31 August 2006). "Fast growing of Indonesian Wikipedia". CNET Asia.

Indonesian encyclopedias
Wikipedia
Internet properties established in 2003
Wikipedias by language